Off the Record is a 1939 American drama film directed by James Flood and written by Niven Busch, Lawrence Kimble and Earl Baldwin. The film stars Pat O'Brien, Joan Blondell, Bobby Jordan, Alan Baxter, William B. Davidson and Morgan Conway. The film was released by Warner Bros. on January 21, 1939.

Plot 

Two newspaper reporters, Thomas "Breezy" Elliott and Jane Morgan, inadvertently send a boy named Mickey Fallon to reform school after they write an exposé of the illegal slot-machine racket the boy was a spotter for. Guilt-ridden, Jane convinces Breezy that they should marry in order to adopt Mickey so they can get him out of reform school.

Cast 
         
Pat O'Brien as Thomas 'Breezy' Elliott
Joan Blondell as Jane Morgan
Bobby Jordan as Mickey Fallon
Alan Baxter as Joe Fallon
William B. Davidson as Scotty
Morgan Conway as Lou Baronette
Clay Clement as Jaeggers
Selmer Jackson as Det. Mendall
Addison Richards as Brand
Pierre Watkin as Barton
Joe King as Brown
Douglas Wood as J.W.
Armand Kaliz as Chatteau
Emory Parnell as Policeman

References

External links 
 

1939 films
1930s English-language films
Warner Bros. films
American drama films
1939 drama films
Films directed by James Flood
Films scored by Adolph Deutsch
American black-and-white films
1930s American films